State Route 441 (SR 441, also known as Moores Lane) is a  east–west state highway in Williamson County, Tennessee in the central part of the U.S. state of Tennessee. It travels along the Franklin–Brentwood city line, just south of Nashville.

Route description 
SR 441 begins at an intersection with US 31/SR 6 (Franklin Road) in Franklin. The highway travels to the east-southeast, along the Franklin–Brentwood city line. Then, it has an approximately  segment in Brentwood proper. After that, SR 441 travels along the city line again. During this stretch, it has an interchange with I-65. Inside this interchange, it enters Brentwood proper for the rest of its length. The highway passes along the northern edge of the Nashville Golf & Athletic Club and Crockett Springs Lake. Then, it curves to the northeast and meets its eastern terminus, an intersection with SR 252 (Wilson Pike).

Major intersections

See also 
 
 
 List of state routes in Tennessee

References 

441
Transportation in Williamson County, Tennessee
Franklin, Tennessee